is an Australian rugby union player who plays as a lock.

References

Australian rugby union players
1993 births
Living people
Rugby union locks
Toshiba Brave Lupus Tokyo players
Australian expatriate sportspeople in Japan
People educated at Brisbane State High School
Japan international rugby union players
Sunwolves players
Brisbane City (rugby union) players
Munakata Sanix Blues players
Urayasu D-Rocks players